Kristin Luck is an American businesswoman. She is a consultant and public speaker, specializing in nontraditional marketing and branding strategies. Prior to launching her own practice, she was company president and CMO (Chief Marketing Officer) of Decipher, a marketing research services provider. She originally took the role in 2007 after Decipher acquired her start-up, Forefront Consulting Group. Decipher was acquired by FocusVision in 2015.

Luck joined ACNielsen to assist in the development of digital rights management. She later co-founded Online Testing Exchange (OTX), an online market research firm. OTX was acquired in January 2004 and she left in December 2005 to start research services company Forefront Consulting Group; Forefront was acquired in June 2007 by Decipher.

She is the founder of the group Women in Research, a networking group, for women in marketing research to facilitate networking, leadership, entrepreneurship and other career development goals.

Luck lectures at industry conferences for groups such as the Advertising Research Foundation, the Council of American Survey Research Organizations and the Marketing Research Association. She is considered a "top voice in market research", in part due to her regular column in the Research Business Report  and the ESOMAR blog, RWConnect. She also serves on several industry committees and boards, such as the Interactive Research Marketing Organization. She was one of the article authors for the inaugural Journal of Brand Strategy and was recently a contributor to the widely read Fast Company blog.

In fall of 2014, Luck was granted the Gold Level award in the Women Executive of the Year category in the international Golden Bridge Awards Program. She also received a Stevie Award in the Executive of the Year category at the 2014 American Business Awards  and the 2014 Advertising Research Foundation's Future Forward Great Minds gold level award. The future-forward category recognizes particular achievement in a trending topic, which was mobile research for the 2014 awards program. In 2013, Luck was the recipient of the Marketing Research Association's Impact Award, the Ginny Valentine Award for "Fearlessly Advocating Gender Equality"  and was named as Female Entrepreneur of the Year by the Portland Business Journal. Last year, Luck received two Stevie Awards for Women in Business in the Female Executive of the Year and Women Helping Women categories. In 2011, Luck received the Entrepreneur of the Year Award from the Best in Biz Awards Program and the Portland Business Journal's 40 Under Forty Award. In 2010, Luck was shortlisted as a finalist for a Stevie Award for Women in Business. She was also awarded the 4 Under 40 Emerging Leaders in Marketing Research Award in 2009 by the American Marketing Association, and was a finalist for the Next Gen Market Research Disruptive Innovators Award in 2010. She is also the current ESOMAR president for the 2021/22 year

References

External links
 Decipher

Market researchers
People from Bend, Oregon
Living people
Businesspeople from Oregon
American chief operating officers
Year of birth missing (living people)